Senator Flynn may refer to:

Carol Flynn (born 1933), Minnesota State Senate
Gerald T. Flynn (1910–1990), Wisconsin State Senate
James Flynn (politician) (born 1944), Wisconsin State Senate
John E. Flynn (1912–2003), New York State Senate

See also
Senator Flinn (disambiguation)